Young Fashioned Ways is the 2004 live album by the noted British folk guitarist, singer and songwriter Wizz Jones. It was recorded live at the  Kulturwerkstatt in Buer, Germany, and released on that venue's own label.

Track listing
"Weeping Willow Blues"      
"Blues Run the Game"
"Blues and Trouble"
"Funny But I Still Love You"   
"Magical Flight"
"Black dog"
"Young Fashioned Ways"
"Mother It's Me"
"Mississippi John"
"Happiness Was Free"
"City of the Angels"
"Come Back Baby"
"Night Ferry"
"Bartender Blues"

Personnel
Wizz Jones - acoustic guitar, lead vocals
Simeon Jones - harmonica, flute, saxophone, vocals

Production
Recording and mastering: Werner Brinkmann, WBM Tonstudio
Photography and cover design: Volker König
Liner Notes: Wizz Jones

Wizz Jones albums
2004 live albums